Katie Simpson is a Canadian journalist who is currently a foreign correspondent for CBC News based in Washington, D.C.

Education 
Simpson holds a Bachelor’s degree in media, information and techno culture from Western University.

Career 
Simpson reported on the Rob Ford video scandal for CP24.

Simpson became a foreign correspondent at the CBC News Washington Bureau in October 2019.

Simpson covered the 2019 Canadian federal election and the 2020 United States elections for CBC.

References

External links 

 Katie Simpson at Twitter
 Katie Simpson at Instagram
 Katie Simpson at LinkedIn
 

Living people
University of Western Ontario alumni
21st-century Canadian journalists
Canadian women television journalists
CTV Television Network people
CBC Television people
Year of birth missing (living people)
Canadian television reporters and correspondents